Béla Kondor (February 17, 1931 in Pestszentlőrinc, Budapest – December 12, 1972) was a Hungarian painter, prose writer, poet, photographer, and avant-garde graphic artist.

References

External links
Fine Arts in Hungary Bela Kondor

1931 births
1972 deaths
Photographers from Budapest
Hungarian male poets
Hungarian illustrators
Modern printmakers
Hungarian printmakers
20th-century Hungarian poets
20th-century Hungarian painters
20th-century printmakers
20th-century Hungarian male writers
Burials at Farkasréti Cemetery
Artists from Budapest
Hungarian male painters
20th-century Hungarian male artists